Imamura (kanji characters for "now" and "village") is a Japanese surname. Notable people with the surname include:

, Japanese seismologist
Ayaka Imamura (born 1993), Japanese voice actress
Fumihiko Imamura (born 1961), Japanese academic, civil engineer
Fumio Imamura (born 1966), Japanese race walker
, notable interpreter
Genki Imamura (born 1982), Japanese athlete in swimming
Hiroji Imamura (born 1949), Japanese athlete in football
Hitoshi Imamura (1886–1968), Japanese Army general during World War II
Masahiro Imamura (born 1947), Japanese political figure
Naoki Imamura (born 1973), Japanese voice actor
, Japanese writer
Norio Imamura (born 1954), Japanese actor
Shikō Imamura (1880-1916), Japanese artist
Shohei Imamura (1926-2006), Japanese film director
, Japanese athlete in volleyball
Taihei Imamura (1911-1986), Japanese film theorist, critic
Takaya Imamura, Japanese artwork designer for Nintendo
Takeru Imamura (born 1991), Japanese athlete in baseball
Takeshi Imamura (1880-1960), Japanese political figure
Tomio Imamura (born 1958), Japanese athlete in karate
Yasunori Imamura (born 1953), Japanese musician
Yemyo Imamura (1867-1932), Japanese Buddhist priest
Youichi Imamura (born 1976), Japanese professional driver
Yūka Imamura (born 1993), Japanese athlete in volleyball
, Japanese footballer
Yuta Imamura (born 1984), Japanese athlete in rugby

Japanese-language surnames